Polyrhachis thrinax is a species of ant in the subfamily Formicinae, found in many Asian countries. There are 6 or 7 subspecies recognized.

Subspecies
Polyrhachis thrinax castanea Stitz, 1925 – Philippines
Polyrhachis thrinax inconstans Viehmeyer, 1916 – Singapore
Polyrhachis thrinax lancearia Forel, 1893 – India
Polyrhachis thrinax lucida Emery, 1894 – Malaysia
Polyrhachis thrinax overbecki Dorow, 1995 – Philippines, Singapore
Polyrhachis thrinax thrinax Roger, 1863 – Philippines, Bangladesh, India, Sri Lanka, Thailand, China

* Possible subspecies
Polyrhachis thrinax nigripes Viehmeyer, 1916

References

External links

 at antwiki.org
Animaldiversity.org
Itis.org

Formicinae
Hymenoptera of Asia
Insects described in 1863